Rugby League World is a dedicated rugby league magazine published monthly in the United Kingdom. Other rugby league titles published by League Publications Ltd include the weekly newspaper Rugby Leaguer & League Express and the annual Gillette Rugby League Yearbook.

History
Rugby League World began life in May 1976 as Open Rugby, founded by Harry Edgar, who published and edited the title until July 1998 when it was sold to League Publications Ltd. Graham Clay then took over as editor, and oversaw the change of title to Rugby League World in March 1999.

A short-lived Australian edition was launched and ran for 7 issues, between March to September 2002.

In 2011 an Apple iPad and Android edition of the magazine was launched.

Although the magazine is aimed at the British market, its important coverage of French rugby league give to Rugby League World a paradoxal position: in 2018,  it is the sole monthly paper magazine in Northern Hemisphere which covers regularly events and competitions  organised on the French territory. The only other one being "Planete XIII", an institutional and official  publication, created by FFR XIII, which is only available by subscription.

List of editors 
'Open Rugby'
Harry Edgar - May 1976 to July 1998
Graham Clay - August 1998 to February 1999

Rugby League World
Graham Clay - March 1999 to February 2002
Tony Hannan - March 2002 to March 2004
Tim Butcher - April 2004 to March 2007
Richard de la Riviere - April 2007 to January 2010
John Drake - February 2010 to March 2013
Gareth Walker - March 2013 to March 2015
Joe Whitley - March 2015 to August 2016
John Drake - August 2016 to February 2018
Doug Thomson - February 2018 to June 2018
Matthew Shaw - July 2018 to February 2019
Alex Davis - February 2019 to May 2020 (suspended due to Covid-19)
Lorraine Marsden - February 2022 to present

Golden Boot Award

 
In 1985, Open Rugby created the Golden Boot Award, to be given annually to the best player of the year, as chosen by a ballot of international rugby league writers and broadcasters. Due to withdrawal of sponsorship, the Golden Boot was not awarded between 1990 and 1998, but the award was resurrected in 1999 and has been presented every year since. In 2011, an ongoing project was started in Rugby League World to determine retrospective winners of the Golden Boot for the years 1990-1998.

The rights regarding this award were sold to the RLIF in the middle of the 2000s.

Sponsorships
In 2002 Rugby League World Magazine sponsored the Great Britain team against Australia in the first Test Match played in Sydney for a decade, and has also sponsored the England team in the European Nations Cup.

See also
 Rugby Leaguer & League Express
 Rugby League World Golden Boot Award

References

External links
 Rugby League World Magazine

1976 establishments in the United Kingdom
Magazines established in 1976
Monthly magazines published in the United Kingdom
Rugby football magazines
Rugby league mass media
Rugby league in the United Kingdom
Sports magazines published in the United Kingdom
Mass media in Yorkshire